José Guillermo Quintana (born January 24, 1989) is a Colombian professional baseball pitcher for the New York Mets of Major League Baseball (MLB). He has previously played in MLB for the Chicago White Sox, Chicago Cubs, Los Angeles Angels, San Francisco Giants, Pittsburgh Pirates and St. Louis Cardinals.

Quintana pitched in Minor League Baseball for the New York Mets and New York Yankees organizations before becoming a free agent and signing with the Chicago White Sox before the 2012 season. He made his MLB debut in 2012, and was named an All-Star in 2016. The White Sox traded Quintana to the Cubs during the 2017 season, and he played for the Angels and Giants during the 2021 season.

Professional career

Minor leagues (2006–2011)
Quintana signed as an international free agent with the New York Mets, and began his professional career in the Rookie-level Venezuelan Summer League (VSL), pitching for the VSL Mets in 2006. He did not play in 2007 as he was suspended for violating the terms of Minor League Baseball's drug policy.

Quintana signed with the New York Yankees in 2008. He pitched the 2008 and 2009 seasons in the Rookie-level Dominican Summer League (DSL) with the DSL Yankees 2. In 2010, he pitched for the Gulf Coast Yankees of the Rookie-level Gulf Coast League and the Charleston RiverDogs of the Class A South Atlantic League. In 2011, Quintana posted a 10–2 win–loss record and a 2.91 earned run average (ERA), with 88 strikeouts in 102 innings pitched for the Tampa Yankees of the Class A-Advanced Florida State League (FSL). He became a minor league free agent after the 2011 season.

Chicago White Sox (2012–2017)
Chicago White Sox' scouts Daraka Shaheed and Joe Siers, who watched Quintana pitch in the FSL the previous season, recommended that the team sign him. Quintana signed with the White Sox, receiving a major league contract, on November 10, 2011. The White Sox assigned Quintana to the Birmingham Barons of the Class AA Southern League.

After he started the season with a 1–2 win–loss record, a 3.06 ERA, and 26 strikeouts in 35 innings pitched for Birmingham, the White Sox promoted Quintana to the majors on May 7, 2012, in accordance with a new MLB rule that allowed teams to carry a 26th man on their 25-man roster during the day of a doubleheader. He made his MLB debut in the first game of the doubleheader, pitching  innings in relief, allowing no runs, one hit, and two walks while striking out three. Quintana was optioned back to Birmingham the next day, and he stayed there until May 24, when he was promoted to the Charlotte Knights of the Class AAA International League. However, he did not pitch there, as he was promoted to Chicago the next day when John Danks was placed on the 15-day IL. On May 25, Quintana got his first Major League victory during a 9–3 victory over the Cleveland Indians pitching six innings giving up two runs on four hits, walking three, and striking out four.

During a game against the Tampa Bay Rays on May 30, 2012, Quintana was ejected by umpire Mark Wegner after throwing a pitch behind Ben Zobrist. During the 2012 year, Quintana appeared in 25 games making 22 starts going 6–6 with a 3.76 ERA.

In 2013, Quintana pitched 200 innings in 33 starts, going 9–7 with 164 strikeouts and a 3.51 ERA. His 17 no decisions were the most among MLB starting pitchers in 2013. On March 24, 2014, Quintana signed a five-year extension with the White Sox, which also includes club options for a further two years. He qualified as a "Super 2" arbitration eligible player after the 2014 season, activating a clause in his contract making the deal worth a guaranteed $26.5 million. During the 2014 year, Quintana made 32 starts going 9–11 with 178 strikeouts and a 3.32 ERA in  innings. He followed up with a 3.36 ERA and 9–10 record with 177 strikeouts in  innings in 2015. That season he led all major league pitchers in curveball percentage (30.9%).

Through the All-Star break in 2016, Quintana pitched to a 7–8 record with a 3.21 ERA in  innings pitched. He was named to the MLB All-Star Game as an injury replacement for Danny Salazar. He finished the season 13–12 with a 3.20 ERA, striking out 181 batters while making 32 starts. Quintana finished tied for tenth in the voting for the American League Cy Young Award with Michael Fulmer, receiving one fifth place vote.

Quintana pitched for the Colombian national baseball team in the 2017 World Baseball Classic. The White Sox named him their Opening Day starting pitcher for the 2017 season.

Chicago Cubs (2017–2020)

On July 13, 2017, the White Sox traded Quintana to the Chicago Cubs for prospects Eloy Jiménez, Dylan Cease, Matt Rose, and Bryant Flete. He made his first start for the Cubs on July 16, striking out 12 in an 8–0 victory against the Baltimore Orioles. Quintana struggled in August, allowing six home runs in 33 innings pitched and allowing six runs in two of the games he started, but had a 2.51 ERA in five starts in September. Between the two teams, in 2017 he was 11–11 with a 4.15 ERA. 

Quintana had a 13–11 record and a 4.03 ERA in 32 starts for the Cubs in 2018. He started the 2018 National League Central tie-breaker game, in which the Milwaukee Brewers defeated the Cubs. After the season, the Cubs exercised their $10.5 million contract option on Quintana for the 2019 season.

Quintana pitched to a 4–1 record with a 2.02 ERA for the month of August 2019. In 2019 he was 13–9 with a 4.68 ERA. 

In July 2020, Quintana underwent surgery to repair a lacerated nerve on his thumb on his throwing arm, which he incurred while washing dishes. He pitched 10 innings in the season, with a 4.50 ERA.

Los Angeles Angels (2021)
On January 22, 2021, Quintana signed a one-year, $8 million contract with the Angels. On May 31, he was placed on the 10-day injured list due to shoulder inflammation. He was activated from the injured list on June 21 and made his return the next day against the San Francisco Giants, and was moved to the bullpen in the process. Quintana struggled for the Angels, posting an 0–3 record with a 6.75 ERA, and 73 strikeouts through 24 appearances.

San Francisco Giants (2021)
On August 30, 2021, Quintana was claimed off of waivers by the San Francisco Giants. Quintana made five appearances for the Giants, posting a 4.66 ERA with 12 strikeouts. On September 30, he was designated for assignment. On October 15, Quintana elected free agency.

Pittsburgh Pirates (2022)
On November 29, 2021, the Pittsburgh Pirates signed Quintana to a one-year contract for $2 million. After having four no decisions and a loss in his first five games as a Pirate, Quintana earned his first win with the team on May 9, pitching six scoreless innings against the Los Angeles Dodgers, striking out five. He tossed seven scoreless innings the very next game against the division rival Reds, but was given another no decision as the team failed to score while he was on the field. For May, he compiled a 2.00 ERA in 27 innings pitched, striking out 21, and going 1–1 for the month.

After compiling a 4.80 ERA and a 0–2 record in six starts in June, Quintana compiled a 3.67 ERA and a 2–1 record in July, earning victories against the New York Yankees on July 5, and against the Miami Marlins on July 23, tossing seven scoreless and striking out four in the latter game.

St. Louis Cardinals (2022) 
After a scoreless effort against the Philadelphia Phillies on July 29, he, alongside Chris Stratton, was traded to the St. Louis Cardinals for Malcom Núñez and Johan Oviedo. He had a 3.50 ERA at this point in the season. 

He made his debut for the Cardinals on August 4 in the second game of a double-header at Busch Stadium, tossing six innings of one-run baseball, and striking out seven. He was charged with another no decision, although St. Louis would win the game, 7–2. He earned his first win with the team against the Colorado Rockies in his next start. He ended August with 3.38 ERA for the month, a 1–1 record, and 20 strikeouts in 29 innings pitched. In September, Quintana won his first start of the month against the Washington Nationals on September 6, and followed this up with eight scoreless innings and six strikeouts against the Cincinnati Reds on September 17. Quintana had a 0.89 ERA in five starts in September, pitching 30 innings, striking out 28 while walking just three, and only allowed three earned runs during the whole month.

For the 2022 season, Quintana finished with a career-best 2.93 ERA in  total innings pitched, striking out 137 in 32 games played, all of them starts. Quintana started Game 1 of Wild Card Series against the Philadelphia Phillies. In the game, he pitched  scoreless innings, striking out 3, and walking just one. However, he was charged with another no-decision, as Phillies starting pitcher Zack Wheeler maintained the Cardinals scoreless.

New York Mets 
On December 9, 2022, Quintana signed a two-year, $26 million contract, with the New York Mets. Just an inning and two thirds into spring training, however, Quintana was diagnosed with a stress fracture in his rib cage. He withdrew from the 2023 World Baseball Classic in which he had been expected to lead the Colombia national baseball team's pitching staff. The Mets announced the following week that additional testing found a benign lesion on his rib and that Quintana would be undergoing surgery which would keep him out until at least July.

Personal life
Quintana and his wife, Michel, have a daughter. During the 2017 Major League Baseball postseason, the Cubs' chartered flight from Washington to Los Angeles had to be diverted to New Mexico when Quintana's wife fell ill. He started the team's next game nonetheless.

See also

List of Major League Baseball players from Colombia

References

External links

1989 births
Living people
American League All-Stars
Birmingham Barons players
Charleston RiverDogs players
Chicago Cubs players
Chicago White Sox players
Colombian expatriate baseball players in the United States
Dominican Summer League Yankees players
Colombian expatriate baseball players in the Dominican Republic
Gulf Coast Yankees players
Los Angeles Angels players
Major League Baseball players from Colombia
Major League Baseball pitchers
People from Bolívar Department
Pittsburgh Pirates players
San Francisco Giants players
St. Louis Cardinals players
Tampa Yankees players
Venezuelan Summer League Mets players
2017 World Baseball Classic players